Akasaki (written: 赤崎 or 赤﨑) is a Japanese surname. Notable people with the surname include:

, Japanese actress and voice actress
, Japanese scientist
Katsuhisa Akasaki (born 1974), Japanese mixed martial artist
, Japanese footballer

See also
Akasaki, Tottori, a former town in Tottori Prefecture, Japan
Akasaki Station (disambiguation), multiple railway stations in Japan

Japanese-language surnames